Evgeniya Sergeevna Karimova (born June 12, 1989) is an Uzbekistani taekwondo practitioner. She won a silver medal for the heavyweight category at the 2006 Asian Games in Doha, Qatar, losing out to two-time Olympic champion Chen Zhong of China in the final match. She also shared her bronze medal position with Jordan's Nadin Dawani at the 2010 Asian Games in Guangzhou, China.

Karimova represented Uzbekistan at the 2008 Summer Olympics in Beijing, where she played for the women's heavyweight category (+67 kg). She lost the first preliminary match by a decisive point and a double defensive kick from Malaysia's Che Chew Chan in the final round, with a score of 4–5.

References

External links

NBC Olympics Profile

Uzbekistani female taekwondo practitioners
1989 births
Living people
Olympic taekwondo practitioners of Uzbekistan
Taekwondo practitioners at the 2008 Summer Olympics
Taekwondo practitioners at the 2006 Asian Games
Taekwondo practitioners at the 2010 Asian Games
Asian Games medalists in taekwondo
Asian Games silver medalists for Uzbekistan
Asian Games bronze medalists for Uzbekistan
Medalists at the 2006 Asian Games
Medalists at the 2010 Asian Games
Asian Taekwondo Championships medalists
21st-century Uzbekistani women